The Ikarus Doppel is a German high-wing, two-place, hang glider, that was designed by Thomas Pellicci and produced by his company Ikarus Drachen Thomas Pellicci.

Production has been completed and the glider is no longer available.

Design and development
The Doppel was designed to be a two-place glider for tourist flying and flight training. The Doppel was only offered in one size.

The aircraft is made from aluminum tubing, with the wing covered in Dacron sailcloth. Its  span wing is cable braced from a single kingpost. The glider certified as DHV Class 1-2.

Specifications (Doppel)

References

Hang gliders